Depositphotos is a royalty-free content marketplace with headquarters in New York, USA. The company was founded by Dmitry Sergeev in November 2009 in Kyiv, Ukraine. The Depositphotos library has over 200million files, including royalty-free stock photos, vector images, video clips, and editorial files. In 2012, the Depositphotos library exceeded 10million files in less than four years and was considered one of the fastest-growing photobanks in the world.

The Depositphotos library consists of 200million files and includes a community of 100,000 contributors.

History

2009–2012 
In November 2009, entrepreneur Dmitry Sergeev founded Depositphotos in Kyiv, Ukraine. In 2011, Depositphotos received $3million in Series A funding from AIM-listed TMT investments.

2013–2014 
In 2013, in direct competition with Foap and EyeEm Depositphotos launched Clashot, a service to sell and purchase mobile stock photographs that received the Best Mobile App award at Microstock Expo in Berlin.

During 2013, the Depositphotos library grew to 20million files and registered their one-millionth client. The same year Forbes Ukraine gave the microstock agency a valuation of nearly $100million. In 2014, Depositphotos launched Bird In Flight, an online magazine about photography and visual culture, which also includes the online magazine WAS and an international photography award "Bird In Flight Prize".

2015–2016 
The company's second major investment was from the EBRD and TMT Investments in December 2015. The following year, the library size grew to 50million files and the company launched Enterprise Solution, a platform for corporate clients and more efficient team collaboration.

2017–2018 
In 2017, Depositphotos announced the release of Crello, an online graphic design tool with ready-made templates to create designs without professional skills. The same year, the company opened Lightfield Productions, the biggest photography studio in Eastern Europe.

2019–2020 
The Depositphotos library celebrated 100million files in 2019. Crello, one of the brands of Depositphotos, released their mobile applications for iOS and Android. In 2019, the Clashot application was terminated.

2021 
In October 2021, Depositphotos and all subsidiaries was acquired by Vistaprint for a total price of $85 million. Crello will be renamed to VistaCreate. Vadim Nekhai, ex-CEO of Despositphotos, becomes the VP of VistaCreate.

Brands

Depositphotos library 
Depositphotos currently has several payment models both for individuals and companies. All images are sold under a royalty-free license with two main types of licenses – standard and extended. Editorial files are available under a limited Standard license.

Crello 
Crello is an online graphic design tool that allows one to create designs for social media, blogs, marketing materials, and other types of ads quickly and without professional design skills. Crello features 25,000 professionally designed templates for static designs and 5,000+ animated templates. Crello has an integrated Depositphotos library, 500,000+ premium photos, and two mobile applications for iOS and Android.

Lightfield Productions 
In 2017, Depositphotos opened Lightfield Productions, the largest photography studio in Eastern Europe to help form a community of photographers in Ukraine. The studio is also functioning as an educational center and a platform for events.

Bird in Flight 
Bird in Flight is an online magazine about photography and visual culture available in English, Ukrainian, and Russian. The magazine features international photographers and artists working in different genres. The topics covered include people, events, projects, and the latest trends in the industry.

WAS 
WAS is an online magazine featuring fascinating stories from around the world, marrying the past with the present in a visual storytelling format.

Focused Collection 
Launched in 2018, Focused Collection is a premium marketplace for stock images and includes more than 400,000 visuals by selected artists and agencies. Partner agencies include 500px, Image Source, and StockFood.

Events and projects

Social Media Week Kyiv 
In 2018 and 2019, Depositphotos hosted Social Media Week Kyiv as a part of the worldwide Social Media Week network taking place annually in major global cities.

Creative Loop 
In 2019, Depositphotos launched Creative Loop, an international event for creators interested in design, advertising, and production.

OFFF Kyiv 
In 2019, Depositphotos organized the international festival of creativity OFFF Kyiv and supported the art exhibition Ukraine WOW.

See also
 Stock photography
 Microstock photography
 Royalty-free

References

External links 
 Depositphotos Website

Stock photography
Photo archives in the United States
Companies based in Florida
Companies based in Kyiv
Internet properties established in 2009